County Kildare was a constituency represented in the Irish House of Commons to 1801.

History
In the Patriot Parliament of 1689 summoned by James II, Kildare County was represented with two members.

Members of Parliament

1429 Sir Richard FitzEustace
1560 Nicholas Eustace and James Flattisbury
1585 William Sutton and Thomas Fitzmorris
1613–1615 John Sutton and Sir William Talbot, 1st Baronet
1634–1635 Sir Nicholas Whyte and Maurice Eustace (Speaker)
1639 Maurice Fitzgerald (expelled and replaced 1642 by Henry Warren) and Maurice Eustace (Speaker)
1661–1666 Hon Robert Fitzgerald and Sir Paul Davys

1689–1801

Notes

References

Bibliography

Constituencies of the Parliament of Ireland (pre-1801)
Historic constituencies in County Kildare
1800 disestablishments in Ireland
Constituencies disestablished in 1800